Kouty (disambiguation) is name of several locations: 
  Kouty, district of Benin
Several locations in Czech Republic
Kouty  (Havlíčkův Brod District) 
Kouty  (Nymburk District) 
Kouty  (Třebíč District) 
Kouty nad Desnou